Ramkot Fort or (AzizKot Fort) is an ancient fort in Mirpur, Azad Kashmir.

History
The fort was built by a Gakkhar, named Sultan Sarang Khan Ghakkar, in 16th century. It is located on the edges of the Mangla Dam.

Syed Aziz Badshah, a well-known politician of Dadyal associated with Khanyara Sharif, rescued the fort from the Sikhs with heavy weapons and named it Aziz Kot.

Gallery

See also
 List of UNESCO World Heritage Sites in Pakistan
 List of forts in Pakistan
 List of museums in Pakistan

References  

Forts in Azad Kashmir